Mohammad Ghorbani  (born May 21, 2001) is an Iranian professional footballer who plays for Persian Gulf Pro League club Sepahan.

Club career

Nassaji Mazandaran
He made his debut for Nassaji Mazandaran in the first fixtures of 2021–22 Persian Gulf Pro League against Fajr Sepasi Shiraz.

References

External links
 

Living people
2001 births
Association football defenders
Iranian footballers
Nassaji Mazandaran players
Persian Gulf Pro League players